Christopher Z. Neyor is an international energy analyst who is former President/CEO of the National Oil Company of Liberia. He is the current president and chief executive officer (CEO) of Morweh Energy Group, an energy consultancy firm. He spent a decade with the Liberia Electricity Corporation and served as the last Managing Director before the 1989 breakout of the Liberian Civil Wars. He is noted for his reformist agenda and the contributions he has made to the energy and educational sectors in Liberia.

Neyor is a former visiting scholar at the Center for Energy and the Environment of the University of Pennsylvania. He did his undergraduate study in Systems Engineering at Wright State University in Dayton, Ohio and pursued graduate work in energy economics at the University of Denver and Management at Stanford University Graduate School of Business. He is a member of the IEEE and a registered Professional Engineer in Texas.

References 

Year of birth missing (living people)
Living people